The Instrument for Pre-Accession Assistance, or simply IPA, is a funding mechanism of the European Union. As of 2007, it replaced previous programmes such as the PHARE, ISPA,  SAPARD  and CARDS. Unlike the previous assistance programs, IPA offers funds to both EU candidate countries (Albania, Moldova, Montenegro, North Macedonia, Serbia, Turkey, Ukraine) and potential candidates (Bosnia and Kosovo).

The previous IPA Regulation covering the period 2007-2013 ("IPA I") was replaced in March 2014 by a new regulation ("IPA II") covering the period 2014–2020. The overall budget allocation for IPA II is EUR 11.7bn. The new regulation streamlined the rules governing access to IPA funds for candidate countries and potential candidates.

A third regulation ("IPA III") covering 2021-2027 is currently being negotiated. The current proposal allocates EUR 14.2bn to fund Albania, Bosnia and Herzegovina, Kosovo, Montenegro, North Macedonia, Serbia and Turkey.

See also 
 Future enlargement of the European Union

References

External links
 Overview
 Website of DG NEAR
 Koeth, Wolfgang (7 April 2014). "The New Instrument for Pre-Accession Assistance (IPA II): Less Accession, more Assistance?" EIPA Working Paper 1/2014

Instruments and programmes related to European Union enlargement